Julian Marc Dunkerton (born March 1965) is a British businessman, and the co-founder of the fashion label Superdry.

Early life
Dunkerton's father Ivor and stepmother Susie founded and ran Dunkertons Organic Cider. Dunkerton moved to Herefordshire from London at the age of 14.

He was educated at Ibstock Place School, London, Orleans Park School, Twickenham, from 11 to 14, and then the Minster School, Herefordshire.

Career
At the age of 19, Dunkerton, along with his then business partner Ian Hibbs, founded the fashion retail chain Cult Clothing Co with a £2,000 loan.

In 2014, Dunkerton took control of his family's cider company, and brought in business partner Jeremy Benson (aka Bean), to work alongside his father Ivor, developing his palate and learning the craft of organic cider and perry making. In 2016, Dunkertons Organic Cider was moved from Herefordshire to a brand new cidery at the 250-acre Dowdeswell Park, near Cheltenham in Gloucestershire.

In 2015, Dunkerton stepped down as chief executive of Superdry and was replaced by Euan Sutherland.

Dunkerton left Superdry in April 2018 to concentrate on his other business interests. He owns The Lucky Onion group, which operates a small group of  hotels, restaurants and pubs in the Cotswolds, England.

In April 2019, Sutherland resigned as CEO of SuperGroup plc after Dunkerton won a bid to be reinstated to the SuperGroup plc board.

Political activism
In the early 1990s, Dunkerton stood three times as a Labour Party candidate in the Cheltenham Borough Council elections. He stood in the St. Peter's ward in 1990, and in the Park ward in 1991 and 1992.

In August 2018, Dunkerton donated £1 million to People's Vote, a campaign group calling for a public vote on the final Brexit deal between the UK and the European Union. He believes that the success of the Superdry business could not have occurred if Britain had been outside the European Union at the time.

In the 2019 general election, he voted for the Liberal Democrats.

Personal life
Dunkerton lives in Cheltenham. In February 2016, he sold just under £50 million of shares to fund his divorce settlement with his wife, Charlotte Abbot. They had two children, one stepdaughter and one daughter.

In 2016, Dunkerton began dating fashion designer Jade Holland Cooper after they met in the bar at one of his hotels in Cheltenham. They went on to marry in August 2018 in the Cotswolds where Craig David sang and Idris Elba deejayed. They have one child, Saphaïa Isabella Dunkerton, born November 2020.

He owns a private jet, which he describes as "a tool rather than an indulgence".

References 

1965 births
Living people
British retail company founders
Labour Party (UK) politicians
People from Cheltenham
People educated at Ibstock Place School
People educated at Orleans Park School